Dendropsophus salli is a frog in the family Hylidae.  It is endemic to Bolivia, Peru, and Brazil.

Initial description

References

Species described in 2010
Frogs of South America
salli
Amphibians of Bolivia
Amphibians of Peru
Amphibians of Brazil